Methodist Church is a historic Methodist church located at Sandy Creek in Oswego County, New York.  It was built in 1878 and is a two-story brick High Victorian Gothic style building with a rectangular plan.  It features a steeply pitched slate roof and a three tiered tower.

It was listed on the National Register of Historic Places in 1988.

References

Churches on the National Register of Historic Places in New York (state)
Gothic Revival church buildings in New York (state)
Churches completed in 1878
19th-century Methodist church buildings in the United States
Churches in Oswego County, New York
National Register of Historic Places in Oswego County, New York